Bara Ahnik Mandir is a Hindu temple of the Puthia Temple Complex in Puthia Upazila, Rajshahi Division, Bangladesh. It stands next to Chauchala Chhota Govinda Mandir and faces east. Architecturally it is exceptional for Bangladesh, the only other of known existence of this type being Rajaram Mandir in Faridpur District. It was built by the Rajas of Puthia.

Location 
Puthia town where the temple is located is accessible by road, 32 km away from Rajshahi town which is also a railhead. Rajshahi is located on the Dhaka Rajashahi Highway.

Features
The temple is located facing the Char Ani Rajbari on the west bank of the Shyamsagar lake. The prominent feature is a triple archway in the centre, with an open platform. The temple "consists of three chambers, dochala in the center and attached two chauchala in its north and south side", hence it is also called tri-mandir (three temples); dochala, meaning two roofs, and char-chala (four roofs) or chau-chala are either square or rectangular in shape with roof in the form of a hut with four sloping parts.
It has a highly adorned eastern facade with terracotta plaques and some of them are stated to be in dilapidated condition.

Gallery

See also
 List of archaeological sites in Bangladesh

References

Puthia Temple Complex
18th-century Hindu temples
Hindu temples in Rajshahi district
Archaeological sites in Rajshahi District